Fulad Kola (also Romanized as Fūlād Kolā) is a village in Babol Kenar Rural District, Babol Kenar District, Babol County, Mazandaran Province, Iran. At the 2006 census, its population was 337, in 79 families.

References 

Populated places in Babol County